Natalia Andreyevna Soboleva (born 11 December 1995) is a Russian snowboarder, specializing in alpine snowboarding. She is the sister of Olympic snowboarder and 2015 World Champion Andrey Sobolev.

Career
Soboleva competed at the 2014 Winter Olympics for Russia. She was disqualified in the qualifying run of the parallel giant slalom. In the parallel slalom, she qualified 15th, then lost to Ester Ledecka in the 1/8 finals, ending up 15th overall.

As of September 2014, her best showing at the World Championships is 7th, in the 2013 parallel slalom.

Soboleva made her World Cup debut in March 2011. As of September 2014, her best finish is 4th, in a pair of events at Bad Gastein. Her best overall finish is 12th, in 2013–14.

World Cup podiums

Individual podiums
  0 wins – (0 PS, 0 PGS)
  3 podiums – (1 PS, 2 PGS)

Team podiums
  1 podium – (1 PSLM )

References

External links

1995 births
Living people
Olympic snowboarders of Russia
Snowboarders at the 2014 Winter Olympics
Snowboarders at the 2018 Winter Olympics
Snowboarders at the 2022 Winter Olympics
People from Tashtagol
Russian female snowboarders
Universiade silver medalists for Russia
Universiade bronze medalists for Russia
Universiade medalists in snowboarding
Competitors at the 2019 Winter Universiade
Sportspeople from Kemerovo Oblast